Akilah may refer to

Akilah!, 1972 Jazz album by Melvin Sparks
Akilah Hospital, Hospital in Jordan
Akilah Institute, College in Rwanda
Azra Kohen (born 1979), Turkish writer known as Akilah

See also

Akhila, a given name
Akila (disambiguation)
Akilam, an Ayyavazhi text
Akilan, a Tamil author
Akeelah and the Bee, a 2006 American drama film